Housecat Housecall is a weekly 30-minute television program that aired on Animal Planet in the United States and Australia. The show was broadcast from June 7, 2008 to July 10, 2010. It was hosted by veterinarian Katrina Warren.

Format
In each episode, people emailed Dr. Warren videos about the problems they had with their cats. Dr. Warren then (in seasons 1 and 2) consulted her colleagues and devised a plan of action. She then visited the people with cat problems at their homes, met their cats, discussed the problems, and offered solutions. She came back a few days later and checked to see if her suggestions worked. Usually they did, and the problems were solved. The show also contained a segment called "Dr. Kat's Corner" in which she gave general cat care advice.

Season 1
Season 1 aired from Saturday, June 7 to Saturday, July 12, 2008. In season 1, Dr. Warren was joined by Dr. Stacy Fuchino and Dr. Debra Horwitz.

Season 2
Season 2 aired from Saturday, June 6 to Saturday, July 11, 2009. It featured 2 new colleagues, Dr. Karen Sueda and Dr. Rich Goldstein. Some celebrities also appeared. The premiere featured actor Peter Weller. Another episode had radio host Kerri Kasem. Musician David Benoit appeared in the season finale.

Season 3
Season 3 no longer had the mentors and aired from Saturday, June 5 to Saturday, July 10, 2010. This season's celebrity appearances included rapper Kurupt and his daughter, St. Louis Cardinals manager and Animal Rescue Foundation founder Tony La Russa, musician Michael Feinstein, and Carrie Ann Inaba of Dancing with the Stars fame.

References

External links
 
 TipsForCatOwners YouTube channel, which contains short webisodes from the first 2 seasons.

Animal Planet original programming
2008 American television series debuts
2010 American television series endings
Television series about cats